Constituency WR-09 is a reserved seat for women in the Khyber Pakhtunkhwa Assembly.

See also
 Constituency PK-37 (Kohat-I)
 Constituency PK-38 (Kohat-II)
 Constituency PK-39 (Kohat-III)
 Constituency WR-13

References

Khyber Pakhtunkhwa Assembly constituencies